Francisco "Paco" Limjuco Dayrit Sr. (1907-1983) is a Filipino fencer and is dubbed as the Father of Philippine Fencing. He founded the then Philippine Amateur Fencers Association in the 1930s which was incorporated in 1957. He was instrumental for campaigning for the recognition of the sports body by the FIE. The sports body was recognized in 1967. He is one of the personalities included at the FIE Hall of Fame.

References

1907 births
1983 deaths
Filipino male fencers
Place of birth missing